Gabriel Lettu (1775, Paris - c.1859) was a French painter, engraver and printer, mostly active in Auch between 1830 and 1840. The Musée des Jacobins houses at least four paintings by him.

Works 

 Henry IV's Château at Pau in Béarn, lithograph, 1825–1830, 51,6x37cm, Musée National du Château de Pau.
 Assumption of the Virgin, high altarpiece of the parish church of Notre-Dame-de-l'Assomption, Castelnau-Magnoac (Hautes-Pyrénées), produced in Auch in March 1830, oil on canvas, 287x210cm.
 The Agony of Saint Martin, oil on canvas, 1841, 162x260cm, church at Réjaumont (Gers).
 Inauguration of the statue of Maréchal Lannes in Lectoure, oil on canvas, 49x41cm, private collection (auctioned at Sothebys 02/12/2003).
 Crucifixion (attributed), early 19th century, chapelle Saint-Barthélémy du lieu-dit Mongardin (Saint-Médard, Gers)
 Visitor guide to Auch Cathedral, with engravings complementing the museum of sacred art, 13 pages of text and 12 black and white plates, 15,5x23cm

References 

19th-century French painters
French printers
People from Auch
French engravers
1775 births
1859 deaths